Henry Douglas Morton (19 October 1867 – 3 June 1932), often referred to as "Harry" or Harry D. Morton, was an Australian politician.

Career
Born at Numbaa near Nowra to surveyor Henry Gordon Morton and Jane Fairles (his brothers Philip and Mark were also New South Wales politicians), he attended Numbaa Public School and then Hurstville College at Goulburn before becoming a bank teller at the Commercial Banking Company of Sydney. He married Maude Lillias Dangar, with whom he had two children. After a period farming on the Macleay River he joined his father in managing the Berry Estate on the Shoalhaven River around 1893. From 1896 to 1899 he was a 2nd lieutenant with the New South Wales Lancers. In 1910 he was elected to the New South Wales Legislative Assembly as the Independent member for Hastings and Macleay. He was Speaker of the Assembly from July to December 1913, completing the final months of Henry Willis's controversial term. When the Nationalist Party was formed in 1917, Morton was one of those to join it. He left the Assembly in 1920 and died in 1932 in Sydney.

Morton was a lover of horses, especially jumpers: his Desmond was a famous high jumper.

He was cremated at Rookwood Crematorium, Sydney on Saturday 4 June 1932.

References

1867 births
1932 deaths
Australian people of Scottish descent
Australian businesspeople
Politicians from Sydney
Australian Army officers
Independent members of the Parliament of New South Wales
Nationalist Party of Australia members of the Parliament of New South Wales
Members of the New South Wales Legislative Assembly
Speakers of the New South Wales Legislative Assembly